Beinn Dearg, meaning "Red Mountain" in Gaelic, is the name of several hills in Scotland:

Beinn Dearg (Ullapool), a  Munro and Marilyn lying southeast of Ullapool
Beinn Dearg (Blair Atholl), a  Munro and Marilyn to the north of Blair Atholl
Beinn Dearg (Torridon), a  Corbett and Marilyn in the Torridon area
Beinn Dearg (Glen Lyon), a  Corbett and Marilyn north of Glen Lyon
Beinn Dearg (Glenartney), a  Graham and Marilyn in the Glenartney area, Perthshire
Beinn Dearg (Skye), a  Marilyn whose parent is The Storr
Beinn Dearg (Menteith), a  Marilyn in the Menteith Hills, the Trossachs